Nathalie Bouvier (born August 31, 1969 in Les Rousses) is a retired French alpine skier. She won a controversial World Cup victory in 1989, in Giant Slalom.

Bouvier also earned a silver medal at the FIS Alpine World Ski Championships 1991 for Downhill skiing, which she lost by only 0.44 second.

World Cup victories

References

1969 births
Living people
French female alpine skiers
Alpine skiers at the 1994 Winter Olympics
Olympic alpine skiers of France
People from Les Rousses
Sportspeople from Jura (department)